Eglinton Street railway station was a railway station approximately  south of , in the Port Eglinton district of Glasgow.

History 
Sources published in the late 20th century claim that this station opened on Sunday 28 February 1909, which would have been highly unlikely given Scotland's sabbatarian culture at the time. Contemporary sources, such as railway notices, timetables, maps and Post Office Directories, show that the station existed nearly 30 years before that date.

These continued to terminate at Bridge Street even after Central Station had opened on 1 August 1879.

On 19 March 1883, there was a collision between two trains at Eglinton Street station in which four people died and many more were injured. The crash involved the 6:15pm train from Central Station to East Kilbride and the 5pm train from Edinburgh to Glasgow Central, which had stopped at Eglinton Street Station. The driver of the Edinburgh train failed to heed the signal against the train leaving the station. The East Kilbride train had left Central on time and had a clear signal to proceed. It was slowing down when it collided with the Edinburgh train which was getting up steam. The drivers and firemen of both trains survived the crash, having been violently thrown from their engines.

Opened by the Caledonian Railway on the former routes of the Cathcart District Railway and Polloc and Govan Railway on the southern approached to Glasgow Central, Eglinton Street station became part of the London Midland and Scottish Railway during the Grouping of 1923. The station was located in the routes to the:
 Two platforms - Cathcart Circle, the Barrhead, East Kilbride and Kilmarnock lines
 Four platforms - West Coast Main Line

The station was closed in 1965.

The site today
Some parts of Eglinton Street station remain intact today, including sections of the platforms and access towers from the station platforms.

Route

References

Notes

Sources 
 
 
 
 Eglinton Street Station on navigable O.S. map

External links
 Photographs and historical maps of Eglinton Street Railway Station from its origins in 1879

Railway stations in Great Britain opened in 1879
Railway stations in Great Britain closed in 1965
Disused railway stations in Glasgow
Beeching closures in Scotland
Former Caledonian Railway stations
Gorbals